Cooper Hoffman (born March 20, 2003) is an American actor. He is the son of the late actor Philip Seymour Hoffman and costume designer Mimi O'Donnell. He made his film debut in Licorice Pizza (2021), written and directed by Paul Thomas Anderson, a frequent collaborator of his late father. For his performance, he gained critical acclaim and was nominated for, among other awards, the Golden Globe Award for Best Actor – Motion Picture Musical or Comedy.

Filmography

Awards and nominations

References

External links
 

2003 births
Living people
21st-century American male actors
American male film actors
Place of birth missing (living people)
Male actors from New York City
People from Manhattan